Gennargentu is a large massif in central-southern Sardinia, Italy, encompassing the provinces of Nuoro and Ogliastra. It includes the highest peaks on the island, such as Punta La Marmora, Monte Spada, Punta Erbas Virdes, Bruncu Spina and Punta Paulinu.

The range forms part of the Gennargentu National Park. Geologically, its rocks are amongst the oldest in Europe, and are therefore smooth shaped: rock types include schist, limestone and granite.

Toponymy
The etymology of the name  is not attested: it could mean "Silver Door", "Door of the Winds" or "Door of Absinthium".

Ski resorts
The mountains are home to the only ski resort on the island: Bruncu Spina ski area.

See also
Gennargentu National Park

References

Mountain ranges of Italy
Mountains of Sardinia
Ski areas and resorts in Italy